Álvaro Raposo de Oliveira (born 5 September 1990)  is a Peru professional tennis player.

Raposo debuted for Peru Davis Cup team in the Davis Cup in 2010 against El Salvador in Lima. He defeated Marcelo Arevalo 6–3, 7–5.

References

External links
 
 
 

Peruvian male tennis players
Living people
1990 births
People from Lima
21st-century Peruvian people